Heterocrossa ignobilis is a species of moth in the family Carposinidae, endemic to New Zealand.

Taxonomy
This species was described by Alfred Philpott in 1930 using material he collected at Governor's Bush, Mount Cook and named Carposina ignobilis. George Hudson discussed this species under that name in 1939 in A supplement to the butterflies and moths of New Zealand. In 1978 Elwood Zimmerman argued that the genus Heterocrassa  should not be a synonym of Carposina as the genitalia of the species within the genus Heterocrassa are distinctive. He proposed that endemic New Zealand species that agreed with the original type specimen of the genus Heterocrassa be assigned to that genus. In 1988 Dugdale assigned this species to the genus Heterocrossa. The holotype specimen is held at the Canterbury Museum.

Description
The wingspan is about 16 mm. The head, palpi and thorax are grey mixed with brown and the abdomen is ochreous. The forewings are narrow and ochreous-grey densely irrorated (speckled) with fuscous. The basal patch is indicated by blackish scales. The hindwings are shining grey.

Distribution
This species is endemic to New Zealand. It has been collected in Canterbury.

Biology and behaviour 
This species is on the wing in January.

References

External links

Image of holotype specimen

Carposinidae
Moths of New Zealand
Moths described in 1930
Endemic fauna of New Zealand
Endemic moths of New Zealand